The Henry Higginson House is a historic house located at 44 Baker Farm Road in Lincoln, Massachusetts.

Description and history 
The three-story Tudor Revival mansion was designed by Julian Ingersoll Chamberlain and built in 1905-06 for Alexander Henry Higginson. It was paid for by Higginson's father, Henry Lee Higginson. It was part of a much larger gentleman's estate that encompassed a significant portion of lands south of Walden Pond, land that was described by Henry David Thoreau as part of Jacob Baker's farm. Higginson lived there until 1933. The house remained in private ownership until 1992, when it was purchased by the Walden Woods Project, dedicated to the preservation of the Walden Woods area.

The house was listed on the National Register of Historic Places on May 26, 2005.

See also
Thoreau Society, whose library is housed here
National Register of Historic Places listings in Middlesex County, Massachusetts

References

External links
Walden Woods Project

Houses on the National Register of Historic Places in Middlesex County, Massachusetts
Houses in Lincoln, Massachusetts
Tudor Revival architecture in Massachusetts
Houses completed in 1906
1906 establishments in Massachusetts